Bethanchok is a Rural municipality located within the Kavrepalanchowk District of the Bagmati Province of Nepal.
The municipality spans  of area, with a total population of 16,777 according to a 2011 Nepal census.

On March 10, 2017, the Government of Nepal restructured the local level bodies into 753 new local level structures.
The previous Chyamrangbesi, Dhungakharka, Chalal Ganeshsthan, Chyasing Kharka and Bhugdeu Mahankal VDCs were merged to form Bethanchok Rural Municipality.
Bethanchok is divided into 6 wards, with Dhungakharka declared the administrative center of the rural municipality.

References

External links
official website of the rural municipality

Rural municipalities in Kavrepalanchowk District
Rural municipalities of Nepal established in 2017